Lavrentyev Institute of Hydrodynamics of the Siberian Branch of the Russian Academy of Sciences is the first research institute based in Akademgorodok of Novosibirsk, Russia. It was founded in 1957.

Departments
 Theoretical Department
 Department of Explosive Processes
 Department of Physical Hydrodynamics
 Department of Deformable Solids
 Department of Fast Processes
 Department of Applied Hydrodynamics

Leaders
 Mikhail Lavrentyev (1957–1976)
 Lev Ovsyannikov (1976–1986)
 Vladimir Titov (1986–2004)
 Vladimir Teshukov (2004–2008)
 Anatoly Vasilyev (2008–2015)
 Sergei Golovin (since 2015)

References

External links
 Lavrentyev Institute of Hydrodynamics SB RAS. Official web site.
 Lavrentyev Institute of Hydrodynamics of the Siberian Branch of the RAS. SB RAS.
 Укротители взрыва: институту гидродинамики им. Лаврентьева 60 лет. Новосибирские новости.

H
Research institutes in the Soviet Union
Institutes of the Russian Academy of Sciences
Science and technology in Siberia
Research institutes established in 1957
Sovetsky District, Novosibirsk
Hydrodynamics
1957 establishments in the Soviet Union